Marie-José Laloy (born 17 June 1950) is a Belgian politician of the Parti Socialiste.

Laloy was born in Rulles, Habay. She was a member of the Senate from 1999 to 2007, and governor of Walloon Brabant from 2007 to 2014.

References 
  www.senate.be

1950 births
Living people
Governors of Walloon Brabant
Women governors of provinces of Belgium
Members of the Senate (Belgium)
Socialist Party (Belgium) politicians
People from Habay
21st-century Belgian women politicians
21st-century Belgian politicians